The 2014 FIFA U-17 Women's World Cup was the fourth edition of the youth association football tournament for women under the age of 17. The final tournament was hosted in Costa Rica.

The competition was played from 15 March to 4 April 2014.  Japan beat Spain in the final 2–0, the same score the same match ended in the group stage. Japan emerged as the fourth different champion in four editions.

The opening match of the tournament set a new tournament record with 34,453 spectators. In total 284,320 supporters attended matches averaging 8,885 per match beating the 2012 record.

Host selection
On 3 March 2011, FIFA announced that the tournament would be held in Costa Rica. There were six official bids.  

Hosting rights were then stripped on 28 February 2013 due to problems in stadium construction. After receiving guarantees from both CONCACAF and the Costa Rican government, they were re-instated as hosts at an executive committee meeting in Zurich on 21 March 2013. The final was originally scheduled on 5 April, but was brought forward one day due to government elections.

Mascot
The official mascot of the 2014 FIFA U-17 Women's World Cup was Juna, a blue morpho butterfly. The name Juna means "to fly" in the Cabécar language.

Theme Song
The official theme song for the 2014 FIFA U-17 Women's world cup was called Pasión Total by F.A.N.S.

Qualified teams
The slot allocation was approved by the FIFA Executive Committee in May 2012. The Oceania Football Confederation qualifying tournament was scheduled for January 2014, FIFA however decided that it would be hosted too late then. Eventually FIFA and OFC in agreement with all member nations agreed to award the confederation spot to New Zealand. Just as New Zealand, Nigeria qualified without playing a match because two opponents withdrew their respective qualifying games. Defending champions France did not qualify.

In total 103 nations took part in the qualifying, three less than for the 2012 World Cup.

1.Teams that made their debut.

Venues
Four stadiums are to be used across Costa Rica.

Match officials
A total of 14 referees, 4 reserve referees, and 28 assistant referees were appointed by FIFA for the tournament.

Squads

Each team must name a squad of 21 players (three of whom must be goalkeepers) by the FIFA deadline. The squads were announced on 6 March 2014.

Final draw
The group stage draw was held on 17 December 2013 in Pueblo Antiguo. Confederation champions Germany, Japan and Mexico were put in Pot 1 alongside the hosts Costa Rica, who were automatically assigned to Position A1. The draw then made sure no teams of the same confederation could meet in the group stage.

Group stage
The winners and runners-up of each group advance to the quarter-finals. The rankings of teams in each group are determined as follows:
 points obtained in all group matches;
 goal difference in all group matches;
 number of goals scored in all group matches;
If two or more teams are equal on the basis of the above three criteria, their rankings are determined as follows:
 points obtained in the group matches between the teams concerned;
 goal difference in the group matches between the teams concerned;
 number of goals scored in the group matches between the teams concerned;
 drawing of lots by the FIFA Organising Committee.

All times are local, Central Standard Time (UTC−6).

Group A

Group B

Group C

Group D

Knockout stage
In the knockout stages, if a match is level at the end of normal playing time, the match is determined by a penalty shoot-out (no extra time is played).

Quarter-finals

Semi-finals

Third place match

Final

Winners

Awards
The following awards were given for the tournament:

Goalscorers
6 goals
 Deyna Castellanos
 Gabriela García

5 goals
 Hina Sugita
 Nahikari García

4 goals
 Marie Levasseur

3 goals

 Manuela Giugliano
 Yui Hasegawa
 Uchenna Kanu
 Pilar Garrote

2 goals

 Nina Ehegötz
 Jane Ayiyem
 Sandra Owusu-Ansah
 Gloria Marinelli
 Annamaria Serturini
 Nana Ichise
 Rikako Kobayashi
 Fuka Kono
 Shiho Matsubara
 Asato Miyagawa
 Janae González
 Rasheedat Ajibade
 Sung Hyang-sim
 Andrea Falcón
 Patricia Guijarro
 Sandra Hernández

1 goal

 Jessie Fleming
 Sarah Kinzner
 Chen Yudan
 Cui Yuhan
 Fan Yuqiu
 Andrea Rodríguez
 Angie Rodríguez
 Sofía Varela
 Kim Fellhauer
 Jasmin Sehan
 Ricarda Walkling
 Ernestina Abambila
 Gladys Amfobea
 Valentina Bergamaschi
 Flaminia Simonetti
 Yu Endo
 Maki Hiratsuka
 Fuka Nagano
 Meika Nishida
 Mizuki Saihara
 Rebeca Bernal
 Jacqueline Crowther
 Belén Cruz
 Cinthia Huerta
 Gabriela Martínez
 Viridiana Salazar
 Daisy Cleverley
 Joy Bokiri
 Aminat Yakubu
 Ju Hyo-sim
 Ri Ji-hyang
 Wi Jong-sim
 Sheryl Barrios
 Fanny Godoy
 Beatriz Beltrán
 Sandra Luzardo
 Tahicelis Marcano
 Kika Moreno
 Yosneidy Zambrano
 Grace Chanda

Own goal

 Sara Páez (for China PR)
 Maria Araya (for Zambia)
 Kim Jong-sim (for Canada)

References

External links
FIFA U-17 Women's World Cup Costa Rica 2014, FIFA.com
FIFA Technical Report

2014
FIFA U-17 Women's World Cup
FIFA U-17 Women's World Cup
2014 FIFA U-17 Women's World Cup
2014 in youth sport
March 2014 sports events in North America
April 2014 sports events in North America
2014 in youth association football